Metaloba is a genus of moths in the subfamily Arctiinae. The genus was erected by George Hampson in 1898.

Species
 Metaloba argante Druce, 1897
 Metaloba nana Druce, 1897

References

External links

Arctiinae